Astrid Hanzalek (January 6, 1928 – September 1, 2019) was an American politician who served in the Connecticut House of Representatives from 1971 to 1981.

She died of a stroke on September 1, 2019, in Suffield, Connecticut at age 91.

References

1928 births
2019 deaths
Politicians from New York City
Women state legislators in Connecticut
Republican Party members of the Connecticut House of Representatives
21st-century American women